Mikhail Leonovich Gasparov (April 13, 1935 in Moscow – November 7, 2005 in Moscow) was a Russian philologist and translator, renowned for his studies in classical philology and the history of versification, and a member of the informal Tartu-Moscow Semiotic School. He graduated from Moscow State University in 1957 and worked at the Gorky Institute of World Literature, the Russian State University for the Humanities, and the Russian Language Institute in Moscow. In 1992 Gasparov was elected a full member of the Russian Academy of Science.

In 1995, Mikhail Gasparov was awarded the State Prize of the Russian Federation.

In 1997, he shared the Little Booker Prize with Aleksandr Goldstein for their publications analysing Russian literature from a historical-philosophical point of view.

In 1999, Gasparov was awarded the Andrei Bely Prize for his essay collection Notes and excerpts.
Gasparov was also a poet. He published translations of classical and modern European poetry, yet only one of his own poems was published during his lifetime.

Gasparov was a member of the editorial board of  Literary Monuments book series, journals Journal of Ancient History, Literary Research, Elementa (United States), and Rossica Romana (Italy).

Mikhail Gasparov published about 300 articles, translations and other works, including the monographs Fable in Antiquity (1971), Modern Russian Versification (1974), Overview of the  History of Russian Versification (1984), Overview of the History of European Versification (1989).

During his last years Gasparov was actively engaged in publishing the collected works of the Russian poet Osip Mandelstam.

Commemorating Mikhail Gasparov, the Russian State University for the Humanities organises annual conferences dedicated to the main fields of Gasparov's academic research -- classical philology and Russian literature of the 19th and early 20th centuries.

Publications
Gasparov M. L. A History of European Versification (transl. by G. S. Smith & Marina Tarlinskaja). Oxford: Clarendon Press, 1996. .
West, M. L. Review of A History of European Versification by M. L. Gasparov; G. S. Smith; M. Tarlinskaja. The Classical Review, New Series, Vol. 47, No. 2 (1997), pp. 431-432.
Pensom, Roger. Review of A History of European Versification  by M. L. Gasparov; G. S. Smith; M. Tarlinskaya. The Modern Language Review, Vol. 94, No. 1 (Jan., 1999), pp. 284-285.

Articles in periodicals
 

(with M. Lotman, P. Rudnev, M. Tarlinskaja) 

(with M. Tarlinskaja)

Contributions to books
 
 'Columbus’s Egg, or the Structure of the Novella', in Persistent Forms: Explorations in Historical Poetics, ed. I. Kliger, B. Maslov. New York, 2016, 392-396
 'An Anthology without Names: 88 Contemporary Poems Selected by Z. Gippius', in Liber, fragmenta, libellus prima e dopo Petrarca: in ricordo di D'Arco Silvio Avalle: seminario internazionale di studi, Bergamo, 23-25 ottobre 2003, ed. F. Lo Monaco, L. C. Rossi, N. Scaffai. Firenze, 2006, 405-409
 'Quantitative Methods in Russian Metrics: Achievements and Prospects', in Metre, Rhythm, Stanza, Rhyme, ed. G. Smith. Colchester, 1980. (Russian Poetics in Translation, 7), 1–19
 'Light and Heavy Verse Lines', in Metre, Rhythm, Stanza, Rhyme, ed. G. Smith. Colchester, 1980. (Russian Poetics in Translation, 7), 31–44
 'Towards an Analysis of Russian Inexact Rhyme', in Metre, Rhythm, Stanza, Rhyme, ed. G. Smith. Colchester, 1980. (Russian Poetics in Translation, 7), 61–75

Bibliography
 
 Wachtel, Michael (2006). Mikhail Leonovich Gasparov (13 April 1935-7 November 2005). Slavonica 12 (1), 73–76.
 Emerson, C. ' In Honor of Mikhail Gasparov’s Quarter-Century of Not Liking Bakhtin: Pro and Contra', in Poetics. Self. Place. Essays in Honor of Anna Lisa Crone , ed. C. O’Neil, N. Boudreau, S. Krive (Slavica Publishers, 2007), 26-49
 Kirschbaum, H. (2008) 'The Poetics of Paraphrase: The Positivist Postmodernism in Mikhail Gasparov’s “Experimental Translations”', in  Russian Language Journal  58 (1): 47-68
 Frontiers in Comparative Prosody. In memoriam: Mikhail Gasparov , ed. M. Lotman, M.-K. Lotman. Bern, Berlin, Bruxelles, 2011 
 Emerson, C. (2016) 'Creative ways of not liking Bakhtin: Lydia Ginzburg and Mikhail Gasparov'. Bakhtiniana 11 (1): 39–69

References

External links
From Gasparov's book Записи и выписки
Wachtel, Michael (2006). Mikhail Leonovich Gasparov (13 April 1935-7 November 2005). Slavonica 12 (1), 73–76.
Brief memorial by Marina Tarlinskaja, friend, colleague, and translator

See also
 Culturology
 Vyacheslav Ivanov (philologist)
 Aron Gurevich
 Alexander Dobrokhotov

Writers from Moscow
Russian philologists
Classical philologists
Literary theorists
Translators from Ancient Greek
English–Russian translators
Italian–Russian translators
Latin–Russian translators
Full Members of the Russian Academy of Sciences
Russian people of Jewish descent
1935 births
2005 deaths
Moscow State University alumni
State Prize of the Russian Federation laureates
20th-century Russian translators
Soviet literary historians
Soviet male writers
20th-century Russian male writers
Corresponding Fellows of the British Academy
20th-century philologists
Russian Latinists